Bocydium is a genus of insects in the treehopper family, Membracidae. A 1999 classification identified 14 species in the genus, distributed around the Neotropics.

Species 
Species include:
 Bocydium amischoglobum Sakakibara, 1981
 Bocydium anisobullatum Sakakibara, 1981
 Bocydium astilatum Richter, 1955
 Bocydium bilobum Flórez-V, nov
 Bocydium bulliferum Goding, 1930
 Bocydium duoglobum Cryan, 1999
 Bocydium germarii Guérin-Méneville, 1844
 Bocydium globulare Fabricius, 1803
 Bocydium globuliferum Pallas, 1766
 Bocydium hadronotum Flórez-V, nov
 Bocydium mae Flórez-V, nov
 Bocydium nigrofasciatum Richter, 1955
 Bocydium racemiferum Sakakibara, 1981
 Bocydium rufiglobum Fairmaire, 1846
 Bocydium sakakibarai Flórez-V, nov
 Bocydium sanmiguelense Flórez-V, nov
 Bocydium sexvesicatum Sakakibara, 1981
 Bocydium sphaerulatum Sakakibara, 1981
 Bocydium tatamaense Flórez-V, nov
 Bocydium tintinnabuliferum Lesson, 1832

References

Stegaspidinae
Auchenorrhyncha genera